Badusa is a genus of flowering plants in the family Rubiaceae. It was described by Asa Gray in 1860. The genus is native to the Philippines (Palawan), New Guinea, and some islands of the West Pacific (Solomons, Fiji, Santa Cruz, Tonga, Vanuatu, and Palau).

Species
 Badusa corymbifera A.Gray - New Guinea, Solomons, Fiji, Santa Cruz, Tonga, Vanuatu
Badusa corymbifera subsp. biakensis Ridsdale - New Guinea
Badusa corymbifera subsp. corymbifera - Solomons, Fiji, Santa Cruz, Tonga, Vanuatu
 Badusa palauensis Valeton - Palau (Micronesia)
 Badusa palawanensis Ridsdale - Palawan (Philippines)

References

External links
Badusa in the World Checklist of Rubiaceae

Chiococceae
Taxa named by Asa Gray
Rubiaceae genera